Stonebridge is a census-designated place (CDP) in Collin County, Texas, United States.

Technically, Stonebridge is part of McKinney, Texas's Stonebridge Ranch, a master planned community. The population at build out is projected to be 30–35,000 residents. The community includes six parks, 830 acres of golf courses, lakes, ponds, sailing, fishing and 8,000+ single family homes, 1700 multifamily units, 280 acres of retail, and 270 acres of office space. Stonebridge's average household income of $138,000.

Within the confines of Stonebridge, there is a hospital, five elementary schools and two middle schools. McKinney and Frisco ISDs offer education to high school students.

Commercial activity is concentrated on the Virginia Avenue Corridor and Eldorado District. Large chains dot the retail landscape including Kroger, Walgreens and Starbucks, multiple restaurants and there several local merchants.

Census-designated places in Texas